The grey-throated white-eye (Zosterops rendovae) is a species of bird. Its family, the Zosteropidae, is probably not valid and belongs in the Timaliidae instead. It is also known as Zosterops ugiensis because Z. rendovae has often been used for the Solomons white-eye (Z. kulambangrae).

It is endemic to the island of Makira in the Solomon Islands archipelago. The Guadalcanal white-eye (Z. oblitus) on Guadalcanal and Bougainville white-eye (Z. hamlini) on Bougainville were formerly considered subspecies, but are now considered distinct species. It inhabits primary forest, mainly at 900–2000 m above sea-level but small numbers occur at lower levels.

It is a small bird, 12–13 cm long. It is fairly dark green above with a brownish tail, a variable dark brown area between the eye and bill and a narrow white ring around the eye. The underparts are dark grey apart from the green chin, pale centre to the belly and yellow undertail-coverts. The bill is blackish with a pale base to the lower mandible.

References 

grey-throated white-eye
grey-throated white-eye
Taxa named by Henry Baker Tristram
Taxonomy articles created by Polbot

Birds of Makira